The Kenya Literature Bureau (KLB) is a publishing house and state corporation in Kenya founded in 1947. It is located in South-C off Popo Road in Nairobi.

History
The Kenya Literature Bureau was initially established by the "East Africa governments (Kenya, Tanzania  and  Uganda)" in 1947 as the East African Literature Bureau as an "offshoot" of the missionary-owned Ndia Kuu Press in order to publish books for the general public in Kiswahili, East African vernacular languages and English. The Bureau's first director was Charles Granston Richards, who held that post for fifteen years. 

The regional status continued after independence with the establishment of the East African Community (EAC). In the early 1970s the Bureau published many pioneering anthologies of English-language poetry from East Africa:
 However, in 1977, the EAC collapsed and the reins of the bureau were transferred to the Kenyan Ministry of Education thereby making it a department under that ministry. In 1980, the KLB Act was passed by the Kenyan Parliament making it a state corporation—a status it holds to this day.

Book series
 Early Travellers in East Africa

References

Further reading
 Shiraz Durrani, Never Be Silent: Publishing and Imperialism 1884-1963, Nairobi: Vita Books, 2006.

External links
 Kenya Literature Bureau - official website

Book publishing companies of Kenya
Government-owned companies of Kenya
East African Community
Education in Kenya
Publishing companies established in 1947
1947 establishments in Kenya